Ust-Gryaznukha is a rural locality (a selo) and the administrative center of Ust-Gryaznukhinskoye Rural Settlement, Kamyshinsky District, Volgograd Oblast, Russia. The population was 856 as of 2010. There are 14 streets.

Geography 
Ust-Gryaznukha is located in forest steppe, on the Volga Upland, on the right bank of the Gryaznukha River, 51 km north of Kamyshin (the district's administrative centre) by road. Verkhnyaya Gryaznukha is the nearest rural locality.

References 

Rural localities in Kamyshinsky District